Kaiser Gates (born November 8, 1996) is an American professional basketball player for the Long Island Nets of the NBA G League. He played college basketball for the Xavier Musketeers.

High school career
Gates attended St. Francis High School. Alongside teammate Kobi Simmons and Malik Beasley, he led the team to two, back to back, state titles. Gates finished with more than 1,200 points and is the school's all-time leading rebounder. He was regarded as three-star recruit and the 10th best player in Georgia by 247 sports and selected Xavier over offers from Texas Tech, Vanderbilt, Florida State, Georgia and Missouri.

College career
Gates posted 3.2 points and 2.6 rebounds per game as a freshman. He missed the first five games of his sophomore season with a knee injury. As a sophomore, Gates averaged 5.8 points and 4.1 rebounds per game and played an important role in Xavier's run to the Elite Eight. In a win over Florida State in the Round of 32, he contributed 14 points, five rebounds and two assists. Gates averaged 7.2 points and 4.6 rebounds per game as a junior. He was a strong defender and shooter, hitting 37.8 percent of his three-point attempts. Gates started 22 games as a junior, with most coming in the first half of the season. After the season, Gates declared for the NBA draft and hired an agent, thus forgoing his senior season at Xavier. He finished his career with 533 points.

Professional career

Windy City Bulls (2018–2019)
After going undrafted in the 2018 NBA draft, Gates signed with the Chicago Bulls for NBA Summer League play. He averaged 6.7 points and 1.7 rebounds per game in three games. Gates signed a training camp contract with the Bulls on September 14, 2018. He was waived by the Bulls on October 12, 2018. Gates was added to the training camp roster of the Bulls' G League affiliate, the Windy City Bulls. On October 18, 2019, the Celtics waived Gates. Gates played in all 50 of Windy City’s games, averaging 12.7 points and 6.5 rebounds per game.

Maine Red Claws (2019–2020)
On September 12, 2019, his returning rights were traded to the Maine Red Claws for the #4 overall pick in the 2019 G League draft. On January 9, 2020, Gates finished with 24 points and 10 rebounds and made a buzzer-beating game-winning layup in a 120–118 triple overtime win over the Capital City Go-Go.

Long Island Nets (2021)
On December 16, 2020, Gates was signed by the Brooklyn Nets, and was then waived the next day. On January 27, 2021, Gates was included in the roster of the Long Island Nets. In 12 games, Gates averaged 9 points and 5.7 rebounds per game.

Hapoel Jerusalem (2021–2022)
On September 8, 2021, Gates signed with Hapoel Jerusalem B.C. of the Israeli Basketball Premier League.

Long Island Nets (2022–present)
On November 4, 2022, Gates was named to the opening night roster for the Long Island Nets.

References

External links

 Xavier Musketeers bio
 NBA G League statistics at Basketball-Reference.com

1996 births
Living people
American men's basketball players
Basketball players from Georgia (U.S. state)
Hapoel Jerusalem B.C. players
Long Island Nets players
Maine Red Claws players
People from Alpharetta, Georgia
Small forwards
Sportspeople from Fulton County, Georgia
Windy City Bulls players
Xavier Musketeers men's basketball players
United States men's national basketball team players